Nationality words link to articles with information on the nation's poetry or literature (for instance, Irish or France).

Events
 Charles de Sainte-Maure, duc de Montausier presented Guirlande de Julie, a manuscript of 41 madrigals to Julie d'Angennes this year (although the manuscript was not published in full until 1729 in poetry); five of the madrigals were written by Sainte-Maure; the other authors were Georges de Scudéry, Germain Habert, Desmarets de Saint-Sorlin, Valentin Conrart, Chapelain, Racan, Tallemant des Réaux, Antoine Godeau, Robert Arnauld d'Andilly and Simon Arnauld de Pomponne; France

Works published

Great Britain
 Thomas Beedome, Poems Divine, and Humane
 John Day, The Parliament of Bees, verse drama, first known edition, published posthumously
 Martin Parker, The Poet's Blind Mans Bough; or, Have Among You My Blind Harpers
 Sir Thomas Urquhart, Epigrams: Divine and Moral
 George Wither, Haleluiah; or, Britans [sic] Second Remembrancer (see also Britains Remembrancer 1628)

Other
 Marie de Gournay, also known as Marie le Jars, demoiselle de Gournay, Les Avis et presents, including a feminist tract, translations, moral essays and verse; second revision (original version, Ombre 1626; revised and retitled, 1634), France

Births
Death years link to the corresponding "[year] in poetry" article:
 February 4 – Jerolim Kavanjin (died 1714), Croatian poet
 April 8 (bapt.) – William Wycherley (died 1716), English playwright and poet
 June 15 – Bernard de la Monnoye (died 1728), French lawyer, poet, philologue and critic

Deaths
Birth years link to the corresponding "[year] in poetry" article:
 January 11 – Juan de Jáuregui (born 1583), Spanish poet, scholar and painter
 August 16 – Thomas Heywood (born sometime early 1570s), English playwright, actor, poet and author
 August – Sir William Vaughan (born 1575), Welsh writer, poet and colonial investor
 Francesca Caccini (born 1587), Italian  early Baroque composer, singer, lutenist, poet and music teacher
 Arthur Johnston (born c. 1579), Scottish poet and  physician

See also

 Poetry
 17th century in poetry
 17th century in literature
 Cavalier poets in England, who supported the monarch against the puritans in the English Civil War

Notes

17th-century poetry
Poetry